Tilde Ladegaard Bork (born 3 August 1993 in Sorø) is a Danish politician, who was a member of the Folketing for the Danish People's Party from 2015 to 2019.

Political career
Bork sat in the regional council of Central Jutland from 2014 to 2016. She was elected into parliament at the 2015 election, where she received 3,198 votes. She didn't run again at the 2019 election, stating that she wanted to get more work experience before continuing her political work.

References

External links 
 Biography on the website of the Danish Parliament (Folketinget)

Living people
1993 births
People from Sorø Municipality
Danish People's Party politicians
21st-century Danish women politicians
Women members of the Folketing
Members of the Folketing 2015–2019